Cabildo can refer to:

 Cabildo (council), a former Spanish municipal administrative unit governed by a council
 Cabildo abierto, or open cabildo, a Latin American political action for convening citizens to make important decisions
 Cabildo (Cuba), African ethnic associations in colonial Cuba
 Cabildo (magazine), an Argentine nationalist Catholic magazine
 Cabildo (opera), a 1932 one-act opera by Amy Beach
 The Cabildo, a historic building in New Orleans, Louisiana
 Cabildo insular, island governments in the Canary Islands
 Buenos Aires Cabildo, a historical building in Buenos Aires, government house during colonial times
 Córdoba Cabildo, a historical building in Córdoba, government house during colonial times
 Cabildo, Chile